Montenegrins living in Germany are supported and represented by various associations. They number around 30,000. Some Montenegrins immigrated during the 1960s and 1970s as Gastarbeiter ("guest workers") when Montenegro was still a part of Yugoslavia. A minority arrived as refugees during the Yugoslav Wars in the 1990s. 

Some Montenegrins still want to migrate to Germany, especially from the northern parts of Montenegro. In 2015, approximately 6,000 attempted to travel into Germany to seek asylum but were unsuccessful. In 2016, 683 Montenegrins were granted work permits. In 2017, this number rose to 876. In 2018, Germany made it easier for Montenegrins to gain a work permit.

See also 
Germany–Montenegro relations

References

External links
German ambassador urges Montenegrin immigrants to stay home
Asylum and the Rozaje exodus
Montenegro Aims to Halt Asylum Seekers

Ethnic groups in Germany
 
Montenegrin diaspora
Germany–Montenegro relations